Vona Groarke is an Irish poet. Groarke was born in Mostrim in the Irish midlands in 1964, and attended Trinity College, Dublin, and University College, Cork.

Groarke has published five collections of poetry with the Gallery Press (and by Wake Forest University Press in the United States): Shale (1994), Other People's Houses (1999), Flight (2002), Juniper Street (2006) and Spindrift (2009). She is also the author of a translation of the eighteenth-century Irish poem, Lament for Art O'Leary (Caoineadh Airt Uí Laoghaire) (Gallery Books, 2008).

Groarke has been a co-holder of the Heimbold Chair of Irish Studies at Villanova University and has taught at Wake Forest University in North Carolina. She now teaches at the Centre for New Writing at the University of Manchester, and in 2010 was elected a member of Aosdána, the Irish academy of the arts.

Awards and honours
Groarke's work has been recognized with awards including the Brendan Behan Memorial Award, the Hennessy Award, the Michael Hartnett Award, the Forward Prize,  and the Strokestown International Poetry Award. Her 2009 volume Spindrift has been nominated for the 2010 Irish Times Poetry Now Award.

Books
 1994: Shale, The Gallery Press, Oldcastle
 1999: Other People's Houses, The Gallery Press, Oldcastle
 2002: Flight, The Gallery Press, Oldcastle
 2004: Flight and Earlier Poems, Wake Forest University Press, Winston-Salem, North Carolina, United States
 2006: Juniper Street, The Gallery Press, Oldcastle; Wake Forest University Press, Winston-Salem, NC
 2009: Spindrift, The Gallery Press, Oldcastle; Wake Forest University Press, Winston-Salem, NC,2010
 2014: X, The Gallery Press, Oldcastle
 2022: Hereafter: The Telling Life of Ellen O'hara,  NYU Press, New York, NY, 10003

References

External links
Wake Forest University Press North American publisher of Vona Groarke

Irish women poets
Wake Forest University faculty
Living people
Aosdána members
People from County Longford
20th-century Irish writers
21st-century Irish writers
20th-century Irish women writers
21st-century Irish women writers
Irish poets
Year of birth missing (living people)